Toussaint Fouda (1 November 1958 – 12 April 2020) was a Cameroonian cyclist. He competed in the team time trial event at the 1980 Summer Olympics.

References

External links
 

1958 births
2020 deaths
Cameroonian male cyclists
Olympic cyclists of Cameroon
Cyclists at the 1980 Summer Olympics
Place of birth missing